"Hello Operator" is a song from De Stijl, the second album by the Detroit, Michigan garage rock band The White Stripes and the first track from it to be released as a 7" single. It was released in May 2000. It is backed by The White Stripes' off-kilter cover of Dolly Parton's "Jolene". Live recordings of both songs are available on Under Blackpool Lights.

A picture disc version of this single exists. "Hello Operator" has been used in both an online and television Converse advertisement.

John Peel listed it as his single of the week on his radio show, even though it was not released in the United Kingdom.

The 7" single was recently reissued by Third Man Records.

Track listing

Personnel
Jack White - vocals, guitars
Meg White - drums
John Szymanski - harmonica

References

External links
White Stripes.net Retrieved January 1, 2006.
White Stripes.net FAQ. Retrieved January 1, 2006.
Live performance of "Hello Operator", Ontario, 2007
Live performance (by The White Stripes) of "Jolene", Coney Island, 2005

2000 singles
The White Stripes songs
1999 songs
Songs written by Jack White
Wikipedia requested audio of songs